Bruno Berger-Gorski (born August 8, 1962, Hagen, Germany) is a German opera director of Polish descent. He lives in Vienna, Cologne and Nuremberg.

Career 
Bruno Berger-Gorski attended the Albrecht Dürer Gymnasium in Hagen, North Rhine-Westphalia. He later attended the University of Vienna, where he studied theater, music and art history and finished with a master's degree. While still at university he wrote a work on Dirk D'Ase called Dirk D'Ase und sein musikdramatisches Werk mit besonderer Berücksichtigung der Uraufführung 'Einstein, Spuren des Lichts (roughly: Dirk D'Ase and his dramatic music works with special consideration for the premiere of Einstein, Footsteps in Light ).  Berger-Gorski has demonstrated a focus on rediscovering old or rarely performed operas. He has directed works by Udo Zimmermann, Ella Milch-Sheriff, Giselher Klebe, Tom Johnson, Manfred Trojahn, Knut Vaage and Camille Kerger. His staging of Offenbach's Die Rheinnixen (The Rhine Nixies) at the Theater Trier was designated Rediscovery of the Year 2005 by the German opera journal Opernwelt. Berger-Gorski is the only active German opera director who has staged operas on four continents.

As an internationally invited director, Berger-Gorski has brought more than 100 opera titles from the standard repertoire onto stages around the world. He also shows a preference for unusual, rare and contemporary works, such as Dirk d'Ase's Einstein (World Premiere in Ulm), Gomes' Condor for the Festival Amazonas de Ópera in Manaus, Wolf-Ferrari's Sly or most recently Adreana Hölszky's Triologia in Bonn or Ella Milch-Sheriff's Baruch's Schweigen at Theater Fürth.

Berger-Gorski's mastery of 5 languages has allowed him to direct at Opera-houses like the Teatro Colon in Buenos Aires, the Gran Teatre del Liceu in Barcelona, the Teresa Carreño Cultural Complex in Caracas, the National Theatre (Prague), the Teatro Solis in Montevideo, the Seoul Arts Center in Korea, in Ashkelon, at the Greek National Opera in Athens and at the Florida Grand Opera in Miami.

At present, Berger-Gorski is directing premieres of works by Josef Tal and Ella Milch-Sheriff in Bonn, Luxembourg and Vienna.  In August 2015, he directed Prokofiev's Betrothal in a Monastery in São Paulo, and in 2016 in Wroclaw, as part of its program as European Capital of Culture, he is putting on a new production of Verdi's Macbeth.

In 2017 Berger-Gorski is invited to direct Samson and Delilah (opera) at the Dallas Opera with Olga Borodina and Conductor Emmanuel Villaume.

Works (selection) 

Source: operabase.com

References

Other sources
 Bruno Berger Gorski: Dirk D'Ase und sein musikdramatisches Werk mit besonderer Berücksichtigung der Uraufführung 'Einstein, Spuren des Lichts' , Philologisch-Kulturwissenschaftliche Fakultät der Universität Wien, 2007

External links
 Bruno Berger-Gorski Operabase

German opera directors
1959 births
Living people